Area code 434 is a telephone area code in the North American Numbering Plan (NANP) for the south-central area of the Commonwealth of Virginia. Lynchburg is the most populous city in the numbering plan area.

Area code 434 serves the cities of Charlottesville, Lynchburg, Danville, South Boston, and Emporia. The numbering plan area comprises Albemarle County, Fluvanna County, Buckingham County, Nelson County, Amherst County, Appomattox County, Campbell County, Pittsylvania County, Halifax County, Charlotte County, Prince Edward County, Nottoway County, Lunenburg County, Mecklenburg County, Brunswick County, and Greensville County, as well as a portion of Greene County, southwestern Louisa County, eastern Bedford County, southern Cumberland County, southwestern Sussex County, far western Southampton County, southeastern Dinwiddie County, and southern Prince George County.

History
In December 2000, the Virginia State Corporation Commission announced that area code 804 would be split because central office prefixes had been anticipated to be depleted by April 2002. Area code 434 was officially effective as of June 1, 2001, on which date long-distance telephone calls could be made using either area code 804 or 434. After January 15, 2002, telephone calls made to numbers within the region required dialing the correct area code.

Service area

Altavista
Amherst
Appomattox
Blackstone
Campbell County
Charlottesville
Chase City
Chatham
Clarksville
Concord
Crewe
Danville
Earlysville
Emporia
Farmville
Gretna
Hurt
Kenbridge
Keysville
Lunenburg
Lynchburg
Palmyra
Prospect
Ruckersville
Scottsville
South Boston
South Hill
Stanardsville
Victoria

See also 
List of Virginia area codes
List of NANP area codes

References

External links

434
434
2001 establishments in Virginia